Cliché is an adjective denoting overuse.

Cliché may also refer to:

In arts and entertainment
 Stereotype (printing), the original sense of the word "cliché"
 Cliché verre, a combination of art and photography
 Cliché Magazine, digital magazine, based in Los Angeles and Las Vegas, that covers such topics as fashion, music, culture, and entertainment
 Cliché, BBC radio comedy sketch show that was followed by the better-known Son of Cliché
 Cliché, 2005 synthpop album by Melotron
 "Cliché (Hush Hush)", a song by Alexandra Stan
 "Cliché (Hush Hush)", 2013 album by Alexandra Stan
 Cliché, a 2017 song by mxmtoon
 Cliché, a working name for Destiny's Child before they settled on their current name
 Kliché, Danish rock band

Other uses
 Cliché forgery, counterfeit coin (a subtype of fourrée) produced using a genuine coin to impress a design into silver foil
 Cliché Skateboards, skateboard company based in Lyon, France
 Karen Cliche, Canadian actress

See also
 Cleché, a cross in heraldry
 Clichy (disambiguation)